The Bishop of Argyll and the Isles is the ordinary of the Roman Catholic Diocese of Argyll and the Isles in the Province of Saint Andrews and Edinburgh, Scotland.

The Scottish hierarchy was restored by Pope Leo XIII on 15 March 1878 and the ancient bishoprics of Argyll and the Isles were re-established and united under one bishop. The Episcopal see is in the town of Oban where the  bishop's seat is located at the Cathedral Church of St. Columba.

On 28 December 2015 Pope Francis appointed Monsignor Brian McGee as bishop.

List of the Roman Catholic Bishops of Argyll and the Isles

See also
 Bishop of Argyll
 Bishop of the Isles
 Roman Catholicism in Scotland

References

Religion in Oban
 
it:Diocesi di Argyll